Hüseyin Bağcı (born 29 December 1959) is a Turkish academic, author and the president of Foreign Policy Institute. He is also a professor at METU, Faculty of Economic and Administrative Sciences, Department of International Relations.

Education 
Bağcı graduated from University of Bonn in Germany with an undergraduate degree in 1985 and then he achieved a doctorate degree from the same university.

References 

Academic staff of Middle East Technical University
University of Bonn alumni
1959 births
Living people